Sincere voting is casting a vote for an outcome that the voter prefers above all others. In an election, sincere voting is formally choosing the voter's most preferred candidate. It might initially seem that all voting would be sincere, since voting is a method for individuals to contribute to a group decision by expressing an opinion. However, the design of many voting systems prevents full expression of voter opinion. As a result, voters may attempt to prevent undesired outcomes rather than support positive outcomes. By definition, insincere voting is when a voter supports an undesired outcome to prevent an even less desired outcome.

Elections with several candidates

Elections allowing only one vote among more than two candidates often require a decision between voting sincerely or insincerely. If the voter's most preferred candidate is unlikely to win, the voter often chooses between the two leading candidates by the lesser of two evils principle. However, vote pairing is another option that can allow two insincere voters to vote sincerely without changing the runoff outcome between the two leading candidates. For example, in the United States Presidential Election, if a Democrat and Republican in the same voting district both agree to vote for third party candidates, they will achieve the same effect in the Democrat/Republican runoff and will also gain the opportunity to vote sincerely for third party candidates.

Voting systems

Voting behavior in complex voting systems tends to develop similarly high levels of strategic complexity.

See also

Tactical voting
Vote pairing

References

Voting theory
Voting
Elections